Mariquita, often referred to as Madame Mariquita, (1838/40–1922) was an Algerian-born dancer who became a ballerina, and later a successful choreographer and ballet mistress at various theatres in Paris from the 1870s until 1920.Though best known for her work at the Opéra-Comique, where she was a trailblazer in modernizing French ballet during the 1900s and 1910s, Mariquita also staged popular ballets and divertissements for boulevard theatres and music halls throughout her life. Highly prolific, she created almost 300 ballets over a period of 50 years. While her life and work are not well documented in modern ballet history, contemporaries regarded her as one of the best choreographers of her time, lauding her as the “French Fokine,” “the model of choreographers,” and “the most artistic of all dance-mistresses.”

Biography 
Little is known about Mariquita’s early life. She was born near Algiers, likely sometime between 1838 and 1840. She is said to have been found by a female dancer as a small child beside a fountain near Aumale in Algeria. She learned to dance even before she could read. 

After the death of her adoptive mother, Mariquita was brought to Paris by an impresario. She débuted in Paris in 1845 in a Vaudeville production at the Théâtre des Funambules at the age of seven or eight, under the stage name “Fanny.” In 1855, Jacques Offenbach offered her a contract at his newly opened Théâtre des Bouffes-Parisiens. During the 1850s, she may also have received classical dance training from premier danseur, Antoine Paul, and in 1858 she joined the ballet corps of the Opéra at the rank of sujet de la danse, but only remained for two months despite incurring a fine for prematurely ending her contract. From the Opéra she went to Madrid, where she danced as a première danseuse.

Around 1860, Mariquita returned to Paris and danced in the spectacular féeries at the Porte-Saint-Martin, where she remained for fifteen years. While there, she created roles for Biche au bois, Le Pied du mouton, La Fée aux chèvres, and Le tour du monde en 80 jours, among others. During this time, she also danced for other theatres, including the Théâtre des Variétés and the Folies Bergère.

Mariquita’s first work as a choreographer was for the Skating de la Rue Blanche, which had a small theatre. She also began choreographing at the Folies-Bergère, collaborating with conductor-composer Olivier Métra on such works as Les Fausses almées, Les Papillons noirs, Les Joujoux, and Les Faunes. By 1880, her work consisted almost exclusively of choreography and teaching: she worked as ballet mistress for the Châtelet, and arranged divertissements for the Skating de la Rue Blanche and the Gaîté-Lyrique. The Gaîté eventually offered her the position of ballet mistress, and she remained in that position for over twenty years into the early 1900s, choreographing such works as Le Grand Mogol, Les Cloches de Corneville, La Fille de Madame Angot, La Poupée, La Jolie Parfumeuse, and Mam’zelle Quat’sous. In 1890, while still working as ballet mistress of the Gaîté, Mariquita was offered a position as ballet mistress for the Folies Bergère. She remained there until 1913, choreographing nearly all of the theatre’s 50 ballets during that period. 

Mariquita was engaged by Albert Carré as ballet mistress at the Opéra-Comique in 1898 where she remained until 1920, creating some 60 shows, while continuing her role as director of dance at the Folies Bergère. Carré reported that she "knew the dances of every period and from every country." During her tenure at the Opéra-Comique, Mariquita and Carré formed a ballet corps respected as "the most artistic in Paris."

In high demand throughout the 1890s and 1910s, Mariquita was nationally and internationally acclaimed as a choreographer. In 1900, she was appointed choreographic director at the Palais de la Dance at the Exposition Universelle. Mariquita continued to work until she fell ill at around age 80. She retired on April 16th, 1920 after an evening attended by the leading artists of the period, completing a career lasting over 70 years. She died on October 5th, 1922.

According to Cléo de Mérode, despite her small size, Mariquita was an imposing figure, always standing straight so as not to diminish her height. Wherever she went, she had her lorgnette and her fan with her. She always held her fan in her right hand, using it as a conductor's baton.

Style 
Mariquita’s choreographic style is difficult to pinpoint; her approach adapted over time and depending on the venue. She was skilled at combining a variety of dances, including character dances, historical dances, classical ballet, dramatic mime, music-hall dances, lascivious dances, and visual tableaux. Mariquita’s popular dance choreography was a site of early innovation, perhaps because popular venues allowed for more flexibility and experimentation. Her works at the Folies Bergère were particularly creative, moving away from post-romantic pantomime-ballet. In her music-hall choreography, she often prioritized spectacle and character dance over classical ballet, and she used parody, contemporary dress, and a mixture of academic and popular dance forms—characteristics that would become part of ballet modernism. 

Mariquita made many changes to modernize traditional ballet, whose stagnation she publicly criticized. In 1901, she claimed that ballet “had given way to so-called virtuosity,” and that “spectacle was killing ballet.” She is credited with being the first to eschew the traditional tutu, which she thought to be “grotesque,” and with eliminating gymnastics routines from classical ballet.  Disliking academic forms of classical ballet, she moved away from standardized steps and poses, instead promoting a more modern dance style with a freer interpretation of the music.

It was in part a desire to break with classical ballet traditions that drove Mariquita to experiment with Ancient Greek-inspired dance at the Opéra-Comique. Although Mariquita began experimenting with this style in popular venues as early as 1897, her most famous Greek dance choreography was done for the Opéra-Comique: productions of Gluck’s Orphée (1899), Iphigénie en Tauride (1900), Alceste (1904), and Iphigénie en Aulide (1907), Thomé’s Endymion et Phoébé (1906), Erlanger’s Aphrodite (1906), and Nouguès' opera-ballet La Danseuse de Pompei (1912). Likely drawing on 1880s academic reconstructions of Greek dance, as well as popular erotic-exotic representations, these choreographies used antiquity as an exotic backdrop for spectacles with mass appeal. By the 1910s, Mariquita had made the Opéra-Comique a centre for innovative choreography.

Choreography

One of the most striking aspects of Mariquita’s career was her ability to choreograph for popular venues even while working for “high art” institutions. She was one of the most prolific female choreographers of her time.  Over the course of her career, Mariquita choreographed over 280 works, including nearly 30 ballets and opera divertissements at the Opéra-Comique.

There are records of Mariquita having choreographed the following shows:

Legacy 
In the years following her death, Mariquita has largely been forgotten from dance history. In her own lifetime, Mariquita was highly regarded as a dancer, teacher and choreographer. As a dancer, she was respected as one of the best character dancers of the era, but also as a technically skilled ballerina. English dancer Edouard Espinosa listed her as one of “the great outstanding PREMIERES ETOILES” of France. As a ballet mistress and choreographer, she was praised by fellow Parisian artists including Jules Massenet, Louis Delluc, Pierre-Barthélémy Gheusi, and Albert Carré. Upon her death, contemporaries credited her with ushering in a new era of ballet, particularly through her Greek-inspired choreography from 1899-1912.

See also
Women in dance

References

1838 births
1922 deaths
Algerian female dancers
French female dancers
French women choreographers
People from Algiers
Dancers from Paris